Oriental Holdings Berhad is a Malaysian conglomerate, mainly involved in car dealerships as well as real estate development, manufacturing and healthcare.

It is notable for the introduction of Honda motorcycles into the Malaysian market.

The current joint group managing directors are Robert Wong Lum Kong and Lim Su Tong @ Lim Chee Tong. The group chairman is Loh Kian Chong

History
The company was founded by the late Tan Sri Loh Boon Siew in the 1960s, beginning as the Malaysian distributor for Honda Super Cub motorcycles and later cars.

The groups has a combined total asset exceeding RM3 billion, shareholders fund exceeding RM2.2 billion and Cash/Cash Equivalent exceeding RM1 billion as of 31 December 2001 (source: annual audited accounts).

Subsidiaries

Automotive
Armstrong Realty Sdn. Bhd.
Armstrong Auto Parts Sdn. Bhd. (Mak Mandin)
Armstrong Auto Parts Sdn. Bhd. (Seremban)
Armstrong Auto Parts Sdn. Bhd. (Melaka)
Armstrong Component Parts (Vietnam) Co. Limited
Armstrong Cycle Parts Sdn. Bhd.
Armstrong Trading & Supplies Sdn. Bhd.
Boon Siew (Borneo) Sdn. Bhd.
Happy Motoring Co. Sdn. Bhd.
Kah Bintang Auto Sdn. Bhd.
Kah Classic Auto Sdn. Bhd.
Kah Motor Company Sdn. Bhd. - (Malaysia Branch)
Kah Motor Company Sdn. Bhd. - (Singapore Branch)
Kah Power Products Pte. Ltd.
KM Agency Sdn. Bhd.
Oriental Assemblers Sdn. Bhd.

Healthcare
Loh Boon Siew Education Sdn. Bhd.
Melaka Straits Medical Centre Sdn. Bhd.
Nilam Healthcare Education Centre Sdn. Bhd.

Hotels and Resorts
Suanplu Bhiman Limited
Park Suanplu Holdings Co. Limited
Kingdom Properties Co. Limited
Silver Beech Operations UK Limited
Silver Beech (IOM) Limited
Silver Beech Holdings Limited
Bayview International Sdn. Bhd.
Bayview Hotel Melaka, Malaysia
Bayview Hotel, Singapore
Kah Australia Pty. Ltd.
Sydney Boulevard Hotel, Australia
Bayview Eden, Melbourne, Australia
Bayview On The Park, Melbourne, Australia
Bayview Geographe Resort, Busselton, Australia
100 William Street
Kah New Zealand Limited
Bayview Chateau Tongariro, Mount Ruapehu, New Zealand
Bayview Wairakei Resort, Taupo, New Zealand

Investment holding and financial services
OAM Asia (Singapore) Pte. Ltd.
Jutajati Sdn. Bhd.
Kwong Wah Enterprise Sdn. Bhd.
North Malaya Engineers Overseas Sdn. Bhd.
Selasih Permata Sdn. Bhd.
Syarikat Oriental Credit Berhad
Unique Mix (Singapore) Pte. Ltd.
Oriental Asia (Mauritius) Pte. Ltd.
Oriental Boon Siew (Mauritius) Pte. Ltd.
OBS (Singapore) Pte. Ltd.
Oriental International (Mauritius) Pte. Ltd.

Plantation
Oriental Rubber & Palm Oil Sdn. Berhad
PT Bumi Sawit Sukses Pratama
PT Gunung Maras Lestari
PT Gunungsawit Binalestari
PT Surya Agro Persada
PT Dapo Agro Makmur
PT Gunung Sawit Selatan Lestari
PT Pratama Palm Abadi
PT Sumatera Sawit Lestari

Plastic products
Kasai Teck See (Malaysia) Sdn Bhd
Armstrong Industries Sdn. Bhd.
Compounding & Colouring Sdn. Bhd.
Dragon Frontier Sdn. Bhd.
Lipro Mold Engineering Sdn. Bhd.
Oriental Industries (Wuxi) Co., Ltd.
Oriental Nichinan Design Engineering Sdn. Bhd.
Oriental San Industries Sdn. Bhd.
Teck See Plastics Sdn. Bhd. (Shah Alam Branch)
Teck See Plastics Sdn. Bhd. (Bangi Branch)

Investment properties and trading of building material products
Oriental Boon Siew (M) Sdn. Bhd.
OAM (Aust) Pty Ltd
Oriental Asia (Aust.) Pty Ltd
Kenanga Mekar Sdn. Bhd.
Konkrit Utara Sdn. Bhd.
Lipro Trading Sdn. Bhd.
North Malaya (Xiamen) Steel Co., Ltd.
North Malaya Engineers Trading Company Sdn. Bhd.
Oriental Realty Sdn. Bhd.
Simen Utara Sdn. Bhd.
Ultra Green Sdn. Bhd.
Unique Mix Sdn. Bhd.
Unique Mix (Penang) Sdn. Bhd.
Unique Pave Sdn. Bhd.

References

External links
Official website

1963 establishments in Malaysia
Conglomerate companies established in 1963
Companies listed on Bursa Malaysia